Angel Airlines, trading as Angel Air, was an airline based in Bangkok, Thailand, which was operational between 1998 and 2003.

Destinations
Over the years, Angel Airlines flew to the following destinations:

 Thailand
 Bangkok — Don Mueang International Airport (Hub)
 Chiang Mai — Chiang Mai International Airport (Focus city)
 Udon Thani — Udon Thani International Airport
 Phuket — Phuket International Airport
 Chiang Rai — Mae Fah Luang - Chiang Rai International Airport
 Khon Kaen — Khon Kaen Airport

 Hong Kong
 Hong Kong International Airport

 Laos
 Luang Prabang — Luang Prabang International Airport

 Singapore
 Changi Airport

Fleet
Over the years, Angel Airlines operated the following aircraft types:

References

Defunct airlines of Thailand
Airlines established in 1997
Airlines disestablished in 2003
2003 disestablishments in Thailand
Thai companies established in 1997